Borgan may refer to:

People
Ole Hermann Borgan (born 1965), Norwegian football assistant referee
Geir Borgan Paulsen (born 1957), Norwegian weightlifter and bodybuilder

Places
Borgan, Iran, a city and capital of Qasr-e Qand County, in Sistan and Baluchestan Province, Iran
Borgan, Norway, an island in the Vikna archipelago in Trøndelag county, Norway